Bulova is an American timepiece manufacturing company that was founded in 1875 and has been owned by Japanese multinational conglomerate Citizen Watch Co. since 2008. The company makes watches, clocks and accessories, and it is based in New York City.

History

Founding
Bulova was founded and incorporated as the J. Bulova Company in 1875 by Bohemian immigrant Joseph Bulova. It was reincorporated under the name Bulova Watch Company in 1923, became part of the Loews Corporation in 1979, and was sold to Citizen at the end of 2007.

In 1912, Joseph Bulova launched his first plant dedicated entirely to the production of watches. Manufacturing watches at their factory in Biel, Switzerland, he began a standardized mass production new to watchmaking. In 1919, Bulova offered the first complete range of watches for women and men in 1924. The visual style of his first popular advertising made its watches popular with the American public. But beyond the original style, precision and technological research also became imperative for Bulova. In 1927, he set up an observatory on the roof of a skyscraper located at 580 5th Avenue to determine universal time precisely.

Bulova established its operations in Woodside, New York, and Flushing, New York, where it made innovations in watchmaking, and developed a number of watchmaking tools. Its horological innovations included the Accutron watch, which used a resonating tuning fork as a means of regulating the time-keeping function.

Advertising milestones

Bulova became a renowned watch company in 1923. Bulova produced the first advertisement broadcast on radio in 1926, announcing the first beep in history: ‘At the tone, it’s eight o’clock, Bulova Watch Time’, an announcement heard by millions of Americans. In 1927, Charles A. Lindbergh became the first solo pilot to cross the Atlantic nonstop. His crossing earned him a Bulova Watch and a check for $1000, and it became an emblem for the brand that created the model "Lone Eagle" in his likeness.  Bulova claims to have been the first manufacturer to offer electric clocks beginning in 1931, but the Warren Telechron Company began selling electric clocks in 1912, 19 years prior to Bulova. In the 1930s and 1940s, the brand was a huge success with its rectangular plated watches whose case was strongly curved to better fit the curve of the wrist.

Bulova produced the world's first television advertisement, on July 1, 1941 (the first day that commercial advertising was permitted on television), before a baseball game between the Brooklyn Dodgers and Philadelphia Phillies over New York station WNBT (now WNBC). The announcement, for which the company paid anywhere from $4.00 to $9.00, displayed a WNBT test card modified to look like a clock with the hands showing the time. The Bulova logo, with the phrase "Bulova  Time", was shown in the lower right-hand quadrant of the test pattern while the second hand swept around the dial for one minute.

In the 1940s, Bulova made a few examples of their complex four sided, five-dial per side "sports timer" analog game clock for use in NHL pro ice hockey games and for the nascent NBA pro basketball league of that time.  They were put in indoor sports arenas such as Boston Garden, Chicago Stadium and the Detroit Olympia. The last example was taken out of service in Chicago in 1976, all replaced by digital-display game timepieces.

In 1945, Arde Bulova, chairman of the board, founded the Joseph Bulova School of Watchmaking to provide training for disabled veterans after the Second World War. The school later became a full-fledged rehabilitation facility, an advocate for disabled people nationwide, and one of the founders of wheelchair sports in the United States. The school closed in 1993.

In 1967, Bulova bought the Universal Genève of Geneva, Switzerland, and sold it in December 1977. The factory in Biel was closed in 1983.

In 1973, Gulf and Western Industries acquired a stake in the company, which it sold to Stelux Manufacturing Company, a Hong Kong-based watch components manufacturer, in 1976.

Accutron

Bulova's "Accutron" watches, first sold in October 1960, use a 360 Hz tuning fork instead of a balance wheel as the timekeeping element. The inventor, Max Hetzel, was born in Basel, Switzerland, and joined the Bulova Watch Company in 1950. The tuning fork was powered by a one-transistor electronic oscillator circuit, so the Accutron qualifies as the second "electronic watch", following the Hamilton Electric released in 1957. Instead of the ticking sound made by mechanical watches, the Accutron had a faint, high-pitched hum which came from the vibrating tuning fork. A forerunner of modern quartz watches which also keep time with a vibrating resonator, the Accutron was guaranteed to be accurate to one minute per month, or two seconds per day, considerably better than mechanical watches of the time.

The Apollo 15 watch
In the 1960s, the company was involved in a rivalry with Omega Watches to be selected as the 'first watch on the Moon'. In 1971, a Bulova chronograph was carried on board Apollo 15, the fourth mission to land men on the Moon, by mission commander David Scott. All twelve men who walked on the Moon wore standard Omega Speedmaster watches that had been officially issued by NASA. Those watches are deemed to be government property. Transcripts from the Apollo 15 Lunar Surface Journal attest to the fact that during Scott's second excursion on the Moon's surface, the crystal on his Omega watch had popped off. So, during his third lunar walk, he used his backup Bulova watch. The Bulova Chronograph Model #88510/01 is the only privately owned watch to have been worn on the lunar surface. There are images of Scott wearing the watch, when he saluted the American flag on the Moon, with the Hadley Delta expanse in the background. The watch shows "significant wear from exposure while on the Moon, and from splashdown and recovery." In 2015, the watch sold for $1.625 million at RR Auction in Boston, which makes it the one of the most expensive astronaut-owned artifacts ever sold at auction and the one of the most expensive watches sold at auction. The watch is also a unique timepiece as it seems to have been a prototype, only revealed by Scott to Bulova's fans in 2014. Therefore, the company released an homage edition of the lunar watch in early 2016, using a modern high frequency quartz movement for the watch that took more than 40 years to make its way into production line.

Computron
During the quartz crisis, Bulova followed the lead of other watchmakers creating electronic quartz watches by introducing the Computron watch in 1976. The Computron was Bulova's first watch with a LED display and first digital watch. It featured a distinctive trapezoidal steel case profile, with the display located on the side of the case rather than the main face. It was marketed as a beneficial design for drivers so that they could view the watch without needing to roll their wrists or release the steering wheel, but this was mitigated by the need to press a button on the side of the case to wake the display. In later versions, repeatedly pressing the button cycled the display to the seconds, date, day, and a second timezone. The success of the Computron was a significant factor in keeping Bulova financially viable through the next several years.

21st century
On January 10, 2008, Citizen bought the Bulova Watch Company for $250 million.

Currently Bulova designs, manufactures, and markets several different brands, including: the signature "Bulova", the stylish "Caravelle" (formerly "Caravelle New York"), the dressy/formal Swiss-made "Wittnauer Swiss", and the "Marine Star". In 2014 Bulova ceased the sale of watches under the "Accutron" and "Accutron by Bulova" brand, eliminating some Accutron models and subsuming others under the "Bulova" brand.

In 2010, Bulova introduced the Precisionist, a new type of quartz watch with a higher frequency crystal (eight times the industry standard ) which is claimed to be accurate to ±10 seconds per year and has a smooth sweeping seconds hand like automatic watches  rather than the typical quartz watch seconds hand  that jumps each second.

From 2012 to 2015, Bulova produced a line of Swiss-Made watches known as Accu•Swiss, which took the place of the previously discontinued Accutron line. Accu•Swiss itself was discontinued in 2015 at the direction of Citizen.

In 2019, Bulova reissued the Computron brand, preserving the size and appearance of the originals, but updating the internal electronics. The new Computrons were made available in chrome, gold, and black, the first two colors being what had been used for the originals.

In 2020, Bulova relaunched the Accutron brand.

See also 

Benrus
Electric watch
Gruen Watch Co.
Hamilton Watch Company

References

External links

 
 Bulova Clocks
 myBulova vintage watch community

1875 establishments in New York (state)
American companies established in 1875
American subsidiaries of foreign companies
Manufacturing companies established in 1875
Manufacturing companies based in New York City
Watch brands
Watchmaking conglomerates
Watch manufacturing companies of the United States
Citizen Watch